Putzbrunn is a town in the district of Munich, Bavaria in Germany.

Geography
Putzbrunn belongs to the area called "Landkreis München", the area around Munich. Villages in the municipality include Solalinden.

Economy
The largest employer in Putzbrunn is the manufacturing company W. L. Gore & Associates, with 900 people working in five buildings.

References

Munich (district)